Love Is the Only Answer is a 2011 Hong Kong comedy film directed by Patrick Kong.

Cast
 Charmaine Sheh
 Alex Fong
 Him Law
 Kelly Fu
 Jason Chan Chi-san
 King Kong
 Timmy Hung
 Anjaylia Chan
 Rose Chan
 Harriet Yeung
 Tyson Chak
 Charmaine Fong
 Jacquelin Ch'ng

References

External links
 

2011 films
2011 comedy films
2010s Cantonese-language films
Hong Kong comedy films
Films directed by Patrick Kong
2010s Hong Kong films